= Ilgonis =

- Gender: Male
- Name day: 27 September

Origin
- Region of origin: Latvia

Other names
- Related names: Ilga

Ilgonis is a Latvian male given name. The name day of persons named Ilgonis is September 27.
